Rail squeal is a screeching train-track friction sound, commonly occurring on sharp curves. 

Squeal is presumably caused by the lateral sticking and slipping of the wheels across top of the railroad track. This results in vibrations in the wheel that increase until a stable amplitude is reached.

Lubricating the rails has limited success. Speed reduction also appears to reduce noise levels.

The sticking of the rim of the wheel causes the wheel to ring like a bell, so rubber dampers or tuned absorbers are a possible solution to lower the volume. The MBTA Green Line, for example, suffers from severe rail squeal on the sharp curves within the central subway. Flange stick graphite lubricators have been installed on trains to attempt to mitigate the rail squeal issue.

The mechanism that causes the squealing also is the cause of wear and tear that is happening in the wheel–rail interface.

Factors 
Factors include:

 Accelerating, coasting or braking
 Diameter of wheel
 Powered or unpowered wheels
 Radius of curve
 Rail lubrication
 Slant of rail (typically 1 in 20)
 Superelevation or cant
 Type of train
 Weather (rails wet or dry) (slippery rail)
 Wheelbase
 Worn profile of wheel
 Worn profile of rail

See also 
 Adhesion railway
 Brake squeal
 Train noise

References 

Permanent way